The canton of La Suze-sur-Sarthe is an administrative division of the Sarthe department, northwestern France. Its borders were modified at the French canton reorganisation which came into effect in March 2015. Its seat is in La Suze-sur-Sarthe.

It consists of the following communes:
 
Chemiré-le-Gaudin
Étival-lès-le-Mans
Fercé-sur-Sarthe
Fillé
Guécélard
Louplande
Malicorne-sur-Sarthe
Mézeray
Parigné-le-Pôlin
Roëzé-sur-Sarthe
Saint-Jean-du-Bois
Souligné-Flacé
Spay
La Suze-sur-Sarthe
Voivres-lès-le-Mans

References

Cantons of Sarthe